HNoMS Stord was a Royal Norwegian Navy destroyer during the Second World War. She was built for the Royal Navy as the S-class destroyer HMS Success, but was transferred prior to completion in 1943 to the Norwegian Armed Forces in exile. Stord survived the war and remained in service with the RNN until 1959.

Description
She was powered by two Parsons geared steam turbines, each driving one propeller shaft, using steam provided by two Admiralty three-drum boilers. Her complement was 170 officers and ratings.

The ship was armed with four 45-calibre 4.7-inch (120 mm) Mark XII guns in dual-purpose mounts. For anti-aircraft (AA) defence, Stord had one twin mount for Bofors 40 mm guns and four twin  Oerlikon autocannon. She was fitted with two above-water quadruple mounts for  torpedoes. Two depth charge rails and four throwers were fitted for which 70 depth charges were provided.

Construction and career
She was laid down as HMS Success, but transferred to the Norwegians before completion. She was renamed HNoMS Stord when commissioned on 26 August 1943 under the command of Lt.-Cdr. Skule Storheill. The ship served in the Home Fleet in the 23rd Destroyer Flotilla.

She played an important role in the Battle of the North Cape sinking of the German battleship . Stord went in as close as 400 yards (360 m) to the Scharnhorst before firing torpedoes. After the battle, Admiral Fraser sent the following message to the Admiralty: "... Please convey to the C-in-C Norwegian Navy. Stord played a very daring role in the fight and I am very proud of her...". In an interview in The Evening News on 5 January 1944, the commanding officer of  said: "... the Norwegian destroyer Stord carried out the most daring attack of the whole action..."

In June 1944 Stord also took part in the Normandy landings.

Postwar
Stord was officially purchased from the UK government in 1946 and scrapped in Belgium in 1959.

A model of Stord (approximately 300:1) can be seen in the D-Day museum at Arromanche, Normandy.

On 28 September 2014, Håkon Nilsen (1913-1976), the torpedo commander aboard Stord during the Scharnhorst attack, was the first Norwegian war veteran who in recognition of heroic service was posthumously awarded the Arctic Star by the United Kingdom.

In 2015 another Arctic Star was awarded to Chief Petty Officer Arne Olsen (1917-1990) who saw active service for the Norwegian Navy.

References

Bibliography

External links

Evig Heder (Eternal Honor) by Norwegian Broadcasting (NRK)

 

S and T-class destroyers
Ships built on the Isle of Wight
1943 ships
World War II destroyers of the United Kingdom
S-class destroyers of the Royal Norwegian Navy
World War II destroyers of Norway
World War II shipwrecks in the English Channel